Dylan Jorge Guilherme Labao Carreiro (born 20 January 1995) is a Canadian professional soccer player who plays as a midfielder for Vaughan Azzurri in League1 Ontario.

Early and personal life
Carreiro was born in Winnipeg, Manitoba, where he attended Clifton School and Garden City Collegiate before moving at the age of 16 to Toronto.

Club career

Early career
Carreiro began his career in his native Winnipeg, playing with Oriole SC, FC Northwest, and the World Soccer Academy. He also played for the youth teams of Toronto FC and Queens Park Rangers.

Dundee
Carreiro signed for Scottish club Dundee in August 2014. in September 2014 he was praised by Dundee youth coach Eddie Johnson. Later that month he joined Arbroath on loan. Dundee manager Paul Hartley stated that "If he does well enough [at Arbroath] he has a chance [at Dundee] later in the season." Carreiro made his Dundee debut against rivals Dundee United on 1 January 2015, appearing as a 71st-minute substitute in the Dundee derby. On 2 February 2015, Carreiro returned to Arbroath for a second loan spell. Carreiro left Dundee via mutual consent on 22 December 2015.

Woodbridge Strikers
Carreiro joined League1 Ontario side Woodbridge Strikers ahead of the 2016 season. Carreiro would be named the League1 Ontario MVP for the 2017 League1 Ontario season.

York University
While playing in League1 Ontario, Carreiro attended York University, where he played varsity soccer for the York Lions. In 2017, he made 17 appearances for York, scoring nine goals. In 2018, he made 10 appearances.

Vaughan Azzurri
In 2018, Carreiro appeared in the final of the League1 Ontario playoffs for Vaughan Azzurri against his former club, Woodbridge Strikers.

Valour FC
In November 2018, Carreiro returned to Winnipeg to sign for Valour FC. He made his debut and scored his first goal for the club on 1 May against Pacific FC. On 16 January 2020 Valour announced Carreiro would be returning to the club for the 2020 CPL season. On 19 October 2020, Carreiro was released by Valour so he could pursue a coaching opportunity in the Toronto area that would potentially also allow him to continue playing in the Canadian Premier League.

Later career
He announced his retirement from professional soccer in February 2021, at the age of 26. He returned to the semi-professional League1 Ontario, re-joining former club Vaughan Azzurri, as a coach and player.

International career
Carreiro has represented Canada at youth level. In September 2013, he received his first call-up to a senior team training camp. In December 2013, Carreiro was named the Canadian U-20 Male Player of the Year.

In September 2014, he received his first call-up to the senior team.

Carreiro was named to the U23 team for the 2015 CONCACAF Men's Olympic Qualifying Championship on 28 September 2015.

Career statistics

Honours
Individual
Canadian U-20 International Player of the Year: 2013
League1 Ontario Second Team All Star: 2016
League1 Ontario First Team All Star: 2017

References

1995 births
Living people
Association football midfielders
Canadian soccer players
Soccer players from Winnipeg
Canadian people of Portuguese descent
Canadian expatriate soccer players
Expatriate footballers in England
Canadian expatriate sportspeople in England
Expatriate footballers in Scotland
Canadian expatriate sportspeople in Scotland
Toronto FC players
Queens Park Rangers F.C. players
Dundee F.C. players
Arbroath F.C. players
York Lions soccer players
Valour FC draft picks
Valour FC players
Scottish Premier League players
Scottish Professional Football League players
League1 Ontario players
Canadian Premier League players
Canada men's youth international soccer players
Canada men's under-23 international soccer players
Woodbridge Strikers players
Vaughan Azzurri players